Old White Meeting House Ruins and Cemetery is a historic site near Summerville, Dorchester County, South Carolina. The meeting house was built about 1700, burned during the American Revolution in 1781, rebuilt in 1794, then reduced to ruins by the Charleston earthquake of 1886. The extant ruins include portions of each cornerthe largest approximately 9’ highand significant remnants of the foundation of walls.  Also on the property is a contributing cemetery.

The site was added to the National Register of Historic Places in 2005.

References

External links
 

Archaeological sites on the National Register of Historic Places in South Carolina
Cemeteries on the National Register of Historic Places in South Carolina
Churches in Dorchester County, South Carolina
National Register of Historic Places in Dorchester County, South Carolina
Summerville, South Carolina